Sven Jajcinovic (born 4 April 1993, Sisak, Croatia) is a Croatian footballer who plays as a midfielder for German amateur side VfB Forstinning.

Club career
He made his debut for Milsami on 23 July 2016 in a game against FC Saxan, Milsami won this game with 2–0.

References

External links 

1993 births
Living people
People from Sisak
Association football midfielders
Croatian footballers
NK Hrvatski Dragovoljac players
FC Milsami Orhei players
Kavala F.C. players
Croatian Football League players
Moldovan Super Liga players
Landesliga players
Croatian expatriate footballers
Expatriate footballers in Moldova
Croatian expatriate sportspeople in Moldova
Expatriate footballers in Greece
Croatian expatriate sportspeople in Greece
Expatriate footballers in Germany
Croatian expatriate sportspeople in Germany